Grorud Idrettslag is a Norwegian sports club from Grorud borough, Oslo. It has sections for association football, skiing, gymnastics and tennis.

General history
As a sports club based in Grorud, it had two predecessor clubs in Grorud IF, which existed from 1904 to 1905, and Grorud TIF, which existed from 1908 to 1914. Grorud IL was finally founded on 18 March 1918. At the time, Grorud was still located in Aker municipality. The district was incorporated into Oslo in 1948 and tied to the city centre with the Grorud Line of the Oslo Metro in 1966.

The club finished construction of its football field in 1926, and its ski jumping hill Rannkollen in 1928. In 1932 the football field was covered with gravel, which allowed the practice of skating sports during the winter. In 1932, Grorud IL was one of the first workers' sports clubs to take up the tennis sport.

Later secretary-general in the UN, Trygve Lie served as secretary in Grorud TIF, and became an honorary member of Grorud IL. He was a central person in the Norwegian Confederation of Trade Unions, and helped the club get a money loan in Akers Sparebank, which financed the field and hill construction. In 1929, Grorud IL decided to join the Workers' Sports Confederation (or AIF), where Trygve Lie also was a central figure. This connection ended in 1946 when the AIF was disbanded. By that time the club had got their club house, designed by noted architect Frode Rinnan.

In 1956, the new ski jumping hill Grorudbakken was opened. It fell apart in October 1957, but was rebuilt in steel. A grass football field was opened in 1966, and the field also featured an athletics track. An indoor arena was opened in 1974.

The club colors are yellow and blue.

Football
The men's football team currently plays in 1. divisjon, the second tier of the Norwegian football league system, after being promoted from the 2019 2. divisjon As Grorud IL, the team played in the 3. divisjon, the fourth tier of Norwegian football, for many years, having been promoted to the 1994 season. After being relegated in 1997 the team quickly returned in 1999. After a long 3. divisjon stint, the team won promotion in 2011 and played in the 2012 2. divisjon.

The men's football team formerly cooperated to prop up an umbrella team called Groruddalen BK, but this team went defunct in 2008. Grorud IL was not the backbone of Groruddalen BK, however; this was Årvoll IL whose league spot was taken over by Groruddalen BK.

Recent history 
{|class="wikitable"
|-bgcolor="#efefef"
! Season
! 
! Pos.
! Pl.
! W
! D
! L
! GS
! GA
! P
!Cup
!Notes
|-
|2010
|3. divisjon
|align=right |2
|align=right|22||align=right|14||align=right|3||align=right|5
|align=right|69||align=right|31||align=right|45
||Second round
|
|-
|2011
|3. divisjon
|align=right bgcolor=#DDFFDD| 1
|align=right|26||align=right|21||align=right|1||align=right|4
|align=right|92||align=right|26||align=right|64
||First qualifying round
|Promoted
|-
|2012 
|2. divisjon
|align=right |10
|align=right|26||align=right|7||align=right|11||align=right|8
|align=right|44||align=right|40||align=right|32
||First round
|
|-
|2013
|2. divisjon
|align=right |4
|align=right|26||align=right|11||align=right|7||align=right|8
|align=right|60||align=right|51||align=right|40
||Second round
|
|-
|2014
|2. divisjon
|align=right |7
|align=right|26||align=right|9||align=right|8||align=right|9
|align=right|49||align=right|51||align=right|35
||Third round
|
|-
|2015
|2. divisjon
|align=right |3
|align=right|26||align=right|17||align=right|3||align=right|6
|align=right|71||align=right|30||align=right|54
||Second round
|
|-
|2016
|2. divisjon
|align=right |4
|align=right|26||align=right|15||align=right|6||align=right|5
|align=right|63||align=right|39||align=right|51
||Second round
|
|-
|2017 
|2. divisjon
|align=right |6
|align=right|26||align=right|11||align=right|4||align=right|11
|align=right|43||align=right|49||align=right|37
||Second round
|
|-
|2018 
|2. divisjon
|align=right |3
|align=right|26||align=right|14||align=right|6||align=right|6
|align=right|46||align=right|31||align=right|48
||Second round
|
|-
|2019 
|2. divisjon
|align=right bgcolor=#DDFFDD| 1
|align=right|26||align=right|15||align=right|6||align=right|5
|align=right|47||align=right|32||align=right|51
||Third round
|Promoted
|-
|2020 
|1. divisjon
|align=right |13
|align=right|30||align=right|9||align=right|7||align=right|14
|align=right|45||align=right|56||align=right|34
||Cancelled
|
|-
|2021 
|1. divisjon
|align=right |13
|align=right|30||align=right|10||align=right|4||align=right|16
|align=right|45||align=right|59||align=right|34
||Third round
|
|-
|2022
|1. divisjon
|align=right bgcolor="#FFCCCC"| 15
|align=right|30||align=right|4||align=right|8||align=right|18
|align=right|34||align=right|69||align=right|20
||Second round
|Relegated
|}
Source:

Current squad

Athletics
The athletics section is now defunct, but has had several prominent members. Hilde Fredriksen notably finished sixth in the unofficial 1980 World Championships in 400 metres hurdles, and also holds the Norwegian record in the event. Trond Knaplund was a decathlete of national renown, and is now a coach.

References

External links
 Official site 
 Grorud Arctic Match - Nordic Stadiums

 
Football clubs in Oslo
Association football clubs established in 1918
Arbeidernes Idrettsforbund
Defunct athletics clubs in Norway
1918 establishments in Norway